Roya Maboudian is an American academic and researcher in the field of chemical engineering. She is professor of chemical and biomolecular engineering at the University of California, Berkeley. She is a co-director of the Berkeley Sensor and Actuator Center, and an editor of the IEEE Journal of Microelectromechanical Systems. She was one of the first women to earn tenure in the chemical engineering department at the University of California, Berkeley.

Education and early career 
Maboudian obtained her B.S. in electrical engineering from Catholic University in 1982. She went on to receive her M.S. and Ph.D. in applied physics at California Institute of Technology in 1984 and 1988, respectively, under advisor David L. Goodstein and co-advisor Paul Murray Bellan.

Research 
Maboudian's research is in the development of new applications of micro- and nano-technology, especially surface chemistry and adhesion. Her early research studied the use of self-assembled monolayers as anti-stiction coatings for MEMS (microelectromechanical) structures. Since then, her work has broadened to other aspects of materials, surfaces, and interfaces, including chemical sensing, gecko-inspired adhesives, and supercapacitors.  

In 2019, she was named a Bakar Fellow, a UC Berkeley fellowship for projects with commercial promise. Her area of focus within this fellowship is miniaturized carbon dioxide sensors.

Awards and honors 
 Bakar Fellow, 2019
 Fellow of the American Vacuum Society, 2014
 Presidential Early Career Award for Scientist and Engineers, 1998
 Arnold and Mabel Beckman Young Investigator Award, 1996
 Hellman Family Award, 1996
 National Science Foundation Young Investigator Award, 1994

References

External links 
 Maboudian Lab webpage
 

Year of birth missing (living people)
Living people
UC Berkeley College of Chemistry faculty
California Institute of Technology alumni
Women chemical engineers
American chemical engineers